Shannan Taylor (born 12 May 1972) is an Australian former professional boxer.

Shannan was trained from his teens in boxing. His training mainly took place at the Bulli PCYC in the boxing room, on the second floor of the building.

In October 2011, he defeated Thailand's Sintung Kietbusaba in his home town of Wollongong to claim the vacant Middleweight world championship of the lightly regarded World Boxing Foundation (WBF). Anthony Mundine had taken the title from him in 2009.

Taylor's best-known fight was a 2001 bout against "Sugar" Shane Mosley in Las Vegas on 10 March 2001, for the WBC welterweight title, although Mosley won, retaining the title.

On 28 November 2011, Taylor was admitted to hospital in Wollongong in a critical condition after a heroin overdose. He regained consciousness after a week in an induced coma.

Professional boxing record

References

External links
Shannan Taylor on BoxRec

1972 births
Living people
Sportspeople from Wollongong
Middleweight boxers
Australian male boxers